Gan (Dhivehi: ގަން) is one of the inhabited islands of Haddhunmathi Atoll, administrative code Laamu and the proposed capital for the Mathi-Dhekunu Province of the Maldives.

History

Archaeology

Gan Island has large ruins from the historical Maldivian Buddhist era.
 A ruin called “Gamu Haiytheli” is situated on Mudhin Hinna in the Mukurimagu ward of the island. Local tradition says that this was the last Buddhist temple of the Maldives.
 Ruins called “Munbaru” in an area called Kuruhinna. These were investigated by H. C. P. Bell in 1923 and a report with photographs was published in his monograph of 1940.

The ruins in Gan were the best preserved ruins from the Buddhist past in the Maldives when H. C. P. Bell excavated some of the island's Buddhist remains, especially one of the stupas and a vihara at Kuruhinna. Recently, however, much vandalism has taken place at those unprotected sites and only scattered stones and mounds of coral rubble remain.

Geography
Gan, combined with the adjoining island of Maandhoo, is the largest geographical island of the Maldives. It is divided in wards, the northernmost of which is called Thundi, in middle is Mathimaradhu and at the south is Mukurimagu. Gan is connected with Maandhoo, the island at its south. Maandhoo is linked with the regional domestic airport at Kadhdhoo by a short causeway. Kadhdhoo adjoins at its south with Fonadhoo, the capital of the atoll. The causeway, which links between Kadhdhoo and Fonadhoo, is almost one kilometre in length.

This island should not be confused with other Maldive islands called 'Gan' in Addu Atoll and Huvadhu Atoll.

Demography

Economy

Development
Gan is the most developed island in the Laamu Atoll. After the 2004 tsunami the French Red Cross and other foreign governments built new buildings, including a new school, a multi-purpose building, a new hospital, bank, primary and secondary schools, water plant, police station and power houses. Tourism has started growing and is going ahead successfully.

Tourism
Gan is the largest island in the atoll and in the Maldives. The island is on the eastern fringes where most islands in the atoll are located.
The island Gan is nestled with astounding beaches. The island also has impressive mounds from a pre-historic Buddhist time. The mounds known as “Hawitta” is a pyramid like structure built in pre-Islamic times and have a history of over 600 years.

The Reveries Diving Village developed by Bison Maldives Pvt Ltd was officially opened by President Mohamed Nasheed 1 February 2011. As it is the first of its kind in the country due to it being developed on an inhabited island.
Reveries with 23 guest rooms, restaurant, internet café, swimming pool, Roof Top Café, Conference facilities, Spa, Padi Certified Dive School and Water Sport facilities will offer a new kind of tourism.

Health Facility
Gan Regional Hospital provides preventive and curative Health services to all the people residing in the South Central Province and also to all the people who request its services. The hospital had a humble beginning as an Atoll Health Centre on 7 November 1993. The demand for services increased and it expanded to an Atoll Hospital on 11 June 2001. Further upgrades took place in the form of facilities and staff. On 1 August 2002, it achieved Regional Hospital status. Gan Regional Hospital serves as the highest referral centre for South Central Province.

See also
History of Maldives

References

HCP Bell, The Maldive islands. Monograph on the History, Archaeology and Epigraphy. Reprint 1940 edn. Malé 1986.
Hand book 2000

Uninhabited islands of the Maldives
Populated places in the Maldives